Tissa Central College ( Thissa Madhya Vidyālaya), located in Kalutara, Sri Lanka, is a national school. It is the first Buddhist English School in the northern part of the town.

History  
The school was founded by Proctor H. A. de Abrew, on 5 November 1936. The first principal appointed to the school was W. S. De Zoysa. The first two teachers at the school were Kusuma Abeywickrama and R. P. Jayawardana.

The school was taken over by the Government on 31 June 1945, along with 54 other schools, under the Central College concept of the Hon. C.W.W. Kannangara.

Today the school has about 3,000 students and more than 100 teachers

Houses
The students are divided among four houses, which represent ancient Kings of Sri Lanka:
 Parakrama - Colour -      Blue
 Vijaya - Colour -      Green
 Abaya- Colour -      Purple
 Gamunu - Colour -      Orange

Sports

Cricket

Tissa's cricket team currently plays in Division II – gold category school competitions, along with some of the leading schools in the country.

The college has produced a number of professional cricketers, who now play domestic cricket in the UK and Australia.

In 2008, Dinesh Perera won the Mobitel 'Schoolboy Cricketer of the Year' (Outstation Contest), and 'Best Bowler' (Outstation Contest). In 2010 Malith Chathuranga Gunasekera also won the Mobitel 'Schoolboy Cricketer of the Year' (Outstation Contest).

In 2017 Tissa Central College U13 cricket team defeated  Prince of Wales College, Moratuwa in the finals of Singer U13 D1 tournament based on bonus match points. Tissa batting was led by skipper Mithira Thenura's century and Shashmika Weerasekara's stubborn 50 runs. Tissa bowling led by Adithya Silva who gave away just 34 runs. Tissa Central reached the under 13 division one final for the first time in their history and they won in their first attempt.

Battle of the Mangosteen
The first of the annual cricket matches between Tissa Central College and Kalutara Vidyalaya, known as the "Battle of the Mangosteen", was held in 1949. It is the second-oldest annual match between two leading Buddhist schools in Sri Lanka and the eleventh-oldest school cricket encounter in Sri Lanka. Of the 61 matches played Kalutara Vidyalaya has won 23, Tissa Central has won seven, and 29 matches have resulted in a draw. In 2016 Tissa completed a comfortable 125 run victory at the Panadura Public Ground.

Notable alumni

References

External links 
 official website

1936 establishments in Ceylon
Educational institutions established in 1936
National schools in Sri Lanka
Buddhist schools in Sri Lanka
Schools in Kalutara